Tan Sri Datuk Amar Stephen Yong Kuet Tze (Pha̍k-fa-sṳ: Yòng Koet-sṳ̂; born 1921–2001, Sarawak, Malaysia) was a former Cabinet Minister in Malaysia. He was the Secretary-General of the Sarawak United Peoples' Party (SUPP) from 1959 to 1982.

Honour

Honour of Malaysia
  : Commander of the Order of Loyalty to the Crown of Malaysia (P.S.M.) (1996)

References

Malaysian politicians of Chinese descent
Malaysian people of Hakka descent
Knights Commander of the Order of the Star of Hornbill Sarawak
People from Dabu
People from Sarawak
Medallists of the Order of the Defender of the Realm
Government ministers of Malaysia
Members of the Dewan Rakyat
Members of the Sarawak State Legislative Assembly
Sarawak United Peoples' Party politicians
2001 deaths
1921 births
Commanders of the Order of Loyalty to the Crown of Malaysia